Edith Oß (1914–2012) was a German dancer and film actress.

Selected filmography
 The Private Life of Louis XIV (1935)
 All Because of the Dog (1935)
 Punks Arrives from America (1935)
 Men, Animals and Sensations (1938)
 We Danced Around the World (1939)
 The Girl at the Reception (1940)
 Women Are Better Diplomats (1941)
 Clarissa (1941)
 We Make Music (1942)
 The Night in Venice (1943)
 A Flea in Her Ear (1943)
 The Time with You (1948)
 Once on the Rhine (1952)

References

Bibliography 
 Lentz III, Harris M. Obituaries in the Performing Arts, 2012. McFarland, 2013.

External links 
 

1914 births
2012 deaths
German female dancers
German film actresses
People from Chemnitz